Pulsatilla patens is a species of flowering plant in the family Ranunculaceae, native to Europe, Russia, Mongolia, and China. Common names include Eastern pasqueflower and cutleaf anemone.

Taxonomy
It was first formally named in 1753 as Anemone patens and is sometimes still considered part of that genus. The species Pulsatilla nuttalliana, the pasqueflower native to much of North America, it is sometimes considered a subspecies or variety of Pulsatilla patens.

Two subspecies are accepted:
 Pulsatilla patens subsp. patens
 Pulsatilla patens subsp. multifida

Cultural associations
Pulsatilla patens is the regional flower of the region of Tavastia Proper in Finland.

References

patens
Flora of temperate Asia
Flora of Europe
Plants described in 1753
Taxa named by Carl Linnaeus
Taxa named by Philip Miller